KWCH-DT (channel 12) is a television station licensed to Hutchinson, Kansas, United States, serving the Wichita area as an affiliate of CBS. It is owned by Gray Television alongside CW affiliate KSCW-DT (channel 33) and maintains studios on 37th Street North in northeast Wichita and a transmitter facility located east of Hutchinson in rural northeastern Reno County. KWCH-DT serves as the flagship of the Kansas Broadcasting System (KBS), a network of four full-power stations that relay CBS network and other programming provided by KWCH across central and western Kansas, as well as bordering counties in Colorado, Nebraska and Oklahoma.

The station was established as KTVH in Hutchinson on July 1, 1953, and was the first television station built within the state. Though based in Hutchinson until 1978, when the main studio was officially moved to Wichita, it has had a presence in that city since 1954. The KBS network took its present form in the early 1960s. KTVH was the third-rated news outlet in the area until the owners of two of the other three KBS stations purchased it, changed the call letters to KWCH in 1983, and successfully led it to first place in the local ratings.

History

KTVH
On June 30, 1952, Wichita-Hutchinson Company, Inc., filed an application for a construction permit to build channel 12 in Hutchinson, which the Federal Communications Commission (FCC) granted on January 8, 1953. The company was composed of several shareholders from Hutchinson and other Kansas cities, including Ray Dillon of the Dillons grocery store family; local car dealer J. C. Child; W. D. P. Carey, whose family owned salt mines; the publisher of The Hutchinson News-Herald; and the owner of radio station KWBW. The call letters KTVH were selected; a tract of land on Plum Street was purchased for studio facilities; and a tower site selected east of town. The first test pattern went out on June 24, 1953, ahead of July 1, when the station launched as the first commercial television station based in Kansas.

KTVH was the first television station to open that covered Wichita, the state's largest city, and recognized that much of its viewing audience would be in the air capital. In August 1954, channel 12 opened a satellite studio in Wichita's Lassen Hotel. Its attempts to provide service to Wichita, in what would become a running theme in the first three decades of station history, rankled the stations licensed there. KAKE radio and television petitioned the FCC in November 1954 to order KTVH to stop identifying as a "Wichita station"; it declined to do so.

In 1955, Wichita-Hutchinson Company sold 80 percent of KTVH to the Des Moines-based Minneapolis Star and Tribune Company (owned by the Cowles family), for $1.07 million. Cowles expanded channel 12's Wichita presence in 1956 by purchasing the former studios of KEDD, the first station to be built in that city, which had just closed. A power increase from 240,000 watts to the class-maximum 316,000 watts followed in 1957. Cowles also made a second effort at seeking permission to identify more closely with Wichita in 1958; the station's president, Joyce Swan, cited confusion from national advertisers, who thought the dual designation of Wichita and Hutchinson signified separate markets, and stated that "it is obvious that an advertising media that covers a large area must cater to the largest metropolitan market". The FCC allowed it to identify as "Hutchinson–Wichita" in 1959 and further tossed out petitions for reconsideration from the two Wichita commercial stations.

As KTVH grew, other television stations were set up in western and central Kansas. 1957 brought the launch of KTVC at Ensign, serving communities including Dodge City and Garden City, and in 1958, television stations were established at Goodland (KWGB-TV) and Hays (KAYS-TV). KWGB-TV aired CBS and NBC programs, while KTVC and KAYS-TV were ABC affiliates engaged in a regional hookup with KAKE-TV known as the "Golden K Network". In 1961, KTVC switched affiliations from ABC to CBS. KAYS-TV purchased the financially struggling Goodland station, then known as KLOE-TV, and combined the two as one operation. Further, KAYS-TV joined CBS on November 1, 1962. The four stations then formed the Kansas Broadcasting System (KBS), which claimed coverage of 66 Kansas counties.

Cowles announced the sale of KTVH to the WKY Television System of Oklahoma City for $4.4 million in December 1968. However, much to both parties' surprise, the FCC voted 4–2 to designate the transaction for hearing in August 1969. The decision was met with dissension even from FCC chairman Rosel H. Hyde, who complained that the majority's conclusions that the acquisition of the Hutchinson station would give the Gaylord interests too much media power and that it might downgrade program service were prejudicial. Hearings were set for November, but by that time, the sale contract neared its expiration on December 31, and Cowles refused to extend it beyond that date. During that time, the FCC also got a new chair, Dean Burch, who chided the commission for taking nine months to designate the proposed sale for hearing; when the two parties asked for approval without such a hearing, the commission refused, preventing the sale from moving forward.

After the WKY sale bid collapsed, Cowles retained KTVH for another 14 years. In 1976, the FCC granted permission for KTVH to shift its main studio from Hutchinson to Wichita as long as it retained current staffing and service levels at its Hutchinson site. In response, channel 12 purchased the Wichita studio site outright after leasing it for 20 years; it also bought an adjacent tract of land and embarked on an expansion of the facility that more than doubled its size. In 1978, KTVH originated 45 percent of its local programming from Hutchinson and 55 percent from Wichita.

"The Look of a Leader"
By 1982, Cowles Media—as the Minneapolis Star and Tribune Company was renamed that year to reflect its media diversification—owned two television properties: KTVH and WDRB, an independent station in Louisville, Kentucky. The Hutchinson station was among its most profitable divisions. However, the company had suffered through an 89 percent decline in earnings in 1981, sparking rumors of a sale. The rumors became reality at the end of July when Cowles agreed to sell KTVH for $12 million to Ross Beach and Robert E. Schmidt of Hays, owners of KAYS and KLOE.

The sale took effect in January 1983. Beach and Schmidt hired a new general manager, Ron Bergamo, and set out to turn around a station stuck in third place in the local news ratings (particularly in the Wichita metro itself) and with a staid reputation. This included major investments in new equipment and hiring consultants to plot a major image revamp, as well as a change of call letters from KTVH to KWCH, which took effect July 4. A goal was set to turn the station into a first-place finisher within 12 to 18 months, and coinciding with the new call letters, the motto "The Look of a Leader" was adopted.

Under Beach and Schmidt, the rebadged KWCH turned around its local news ratings and had become a serious and successful challenger to KAKE, the metro-area leader, by 1986. By 1988, it had dislodged KAKE from first place in a majority of time slots. In addition, Beach and Schmidt had acquired KTVC, the last television station in western Kansas not owned by a Wichita-area station, in 1988. The turnaround attracted the interest of Michigan-based Smith Broadcasting, who made an unexpected and unsolicited $45 million purchase offer for KBS that Beach and Schmidt accepted that same year. Among Smith's first actions were to appoint part-owner Sandy DiPasquale, who later became the CEO of Newport Television, as president and general manager and to change the call letters on the western and central Kansas stations to designations that incorporated "KBS". DiPasquale became the majority owner in 1992 as Smith sold his interests in KBS to buy other broadcast properties.

Spartan Communications of Spartanburg, South Carolina, purchased KBS from DiPasquale in 1994 for $58 million. Spartan merged with Media General in 2000.

Schurz and Gray ownership
On April 6, 2006, Media General announced that it would sell KWCH, its satellites, and four other stations as a result of its purchase of four former NBC owned-and-operated-stations (WVTM-TV in Birmingham, Alabama, WCMH in Columbus, Ohio, WNCN in Goldsboro, North Carolina and WJAR-TV in Providence, Rhode Island). South Bend, Indiana-based Schurz Communications eventually emerged as the winner and took over on September 25, at which time Schurz formed a new subsidiary known as "Sunflower Broadcasting, Inc.," which became the licensee for its Wichita media market broadcasting properties. In July 2007, KSCW became a sister station to KWCH after Schurz bought the station through a failing station waiver. In 2009, Schurz further expanded its operations by entering into an agreement with Entravision Communications, which was preparing to launch Univision affiliate KDCU-DT, to provide local advertising sales, technical functions, and transmitter tower space, which would continue until Entravision eventually brought operations in-house.

Schurz announced on September 14, 2015, that it would exit from broadcasting and sell its entire broadcasting division, including KWCH (and its satellites), KSCW-DT, and the JSA with KDCU-DT, to Gray Television for approximately $442.5 million. Gray already owned KAKE, which it divested to Lockwood Broadcast Group in order to retain the higher-rated KWCH. The FCC approved the sale on February 12, 2016, and the sale was completed on February 16.

News operation

Prior to 1983, KTVH was generally an also-ran in local news. Viewers found it stodgy and conservative, and KAKE and KSNW both regularly trounced channel 12 in the ratings; KAKE drew three to four times as many households in the Wichita metro, while KTVH drew barely half the news ratings of KSN in the full market. The KWCH overhaul orchestrated by Beach and Schmidt brought a series of changes, including the adoption of the Eyewitness News moniker; the station's first professionally built set; and a new female anchor, Susan Peters, to present the news alongside market veteran Roger Cornish. Over the decade that followed, KWCH rose to the top of the local news ratings, first in the Wichita metro and then in the full market beginning in 1991.

The other KBS stations, which were not co-owned with KWCH until the 1980s, produced their own local news programs. In 1991, KBSH in Hays abandoned its longstanding separate evening news and switched to inserting a segment of local news into the KWCH broadcasts. In January 2002, this was discontinued, and news stories from Hays were sent to Wichita for incorporation into KWCH's newscasts. Similarly, the local news in Dodge City was trimmed back from a full program to inserts and then to reports in KWCH's own newscasts. In 2005, KWCH began producing an insert into its news for Cox Communications cable customers in Salina.

On January 19, 2004, KWCH began producing a half-hour primetime newscast at 9:00 p.m. for Fox affiliate KSAS-TV through a news share agreement. In September 2007, after its acquisition of KSCW, KWCH began producing a two-hour extension of its weekday morning newscast for KSCW; this later expanded on September 12, 2011, to include half-hour newscasts at 4:00 p.m. weekdays and nightly at 9:00 p.m. For the rest of 2011, KSAS and KSCW carried simultaneous and separate newscasts before KSNW assumed the KSAS news production contract at the start of 2012. This resulted in a lawsuit where KSAS alleged a breach of contract because it was receiving a taped newscast instead of a live one; the suit was settled when KWCH agreed to air the Fox newscast live for the remainder of the contract.

In April 2011, KWCH began producing a weeknight Spanish-language newscast at 10:00 p.m. for KDCU-DT, which was produced for the remainder of the JSA with Entravision.

Beyond local news programs, KWCH operates the high school sports vertical Catch It Kansas, which includes a website and a weekly show aired on KSCW.

Notable former on-air staff
 David Bloom, reporter (1988–1990)
 Cheryl Burton, anchor (now at WLS-TV in Chicago)
 Shon Gables, anchor/reporter
 Andrea Joyce (Andi Joyce), anchor (later at CBS Sports and NBC Sports)
 Susan Peters, anchor (1983–1991); now at KPTS

Technical information

Subchannels
The station's digital signal is multiplexed:

Analog-to-digital conversion
KWCH shut down its analog signal, over VHF channel 12, on February 17, 2009, the original target date in which full-power television stations in the United States were to transition from analog to digital broadcasts under federal mandate (which was later pushed back to June 12, 2009). The station's digital signal relocated from its pre-transition UHF channel 19 to VHF channel 12.

After the transition, KWCH became one of four television stations that operated their digital signals on the VHF band that were granted a power increase later that month due to reception issues that the stations experienced as a result of moving their digital channel allocations from UHF to VHF. As reception problems continued even after the increase, the FCC granted KWCH-DT permission to swap transmitter facilities with sister station KSCW-DT; on September 29, 2009, KWCH-DT moved its digital signal back to UHF channel 19, with KSCW-DT moving its digital allocation to VHF channel 12.

In 2012, Schurz built a digital replacement translator of KSCW-DT in Wichita, broadcast from the studios. The 12.1 and 12.2 subchannels are also carried; this aids reception of KSCW and KWCH in parts of Wichita that may not get as strong a signal from the Hutchinson transmitters.

Satellites

KWCH operates a network of three additional full-power satellite stations covering central and western Kansas, which together with KWCH are branded as the Kansas Broadcasting System (KBS). These stations—KBSD-DT in southwestern Kansas and KBSH-DT and KBSL-DT serving northwestern Kansas—are counted as one outlet for ratings and regulatory purposes. KBS was formed in 1962 and provided network programming and advertising sales functions to the then-separately owned stations; trade advertising boasted that advertisers had the ease of "One Order, One Invoice, One Check" working with KBS.

Notes

References

External links

CatchItKansas website

WCH-DT
CBS network affiliates
Gray Television
Television channels and stations established in 1953
1953 establishments in Kansas
Heroes & Icons affiliates
Circle (TV network) affiliates